The Jurkat–Richert theorem is a mathematical theorem in sieve theory. It is a key ingredient in proofs of Chen's theorem on Goldbach's conjecture.
It was proved in 1965 by Wolfgang B. Jurkat and Hans-Egon Richert.

Statement of the theorem
This formulation is from Diamond & Halberstam.
Other formulations are in Jurkat & Richert, Halberstam & Richert,
and Nathanson.

Suppose A is a finite sequence of integers and P is a set of primes. Write Ad for the number of items in A that are divisible by d, and write P(z) for the product of the elements in P that are less than z. Write ω(d) for a multiplicative function such that ω(p)/p is approximately the proportion of elements of A divisible by p, write X for any convenient approximation to |A|, and write the remainder as

 

Write S(A,P,z) for the number of items in A that are relatively prime to P(z). Write

 

Write ν(m) for the number of distinct prime divisors of m. Write F1 and f1 for functions satisfying certain difference differential equations (see Diamond & Halberstam for the definition and properties).

We assume the dimension (sifting density) is 1: that is, there is a constant C such that for 2 ≤ z < w we have

 

(The book of Diamond & Halberstam extends the theorem to dimensions higher than 1.) Then the Jurkat–Richert theorem states that for any numbers y and z with 2 ≤ z ≤ y ≤ X we have

 

and

Notes

Sieve theory
Theorems in analytic number theory